Law of primacy may refer to:

In advertising, the law of primacy in persuasion first described by Frederick Hansen Lund in 1925.
In educational psychology, primacy as one of the principles of learning.